BC Savanoris is basketball club of Alytus, Lithuania. It was founded in 2011 and replaced BC Alytus in national pyramid of basketball. Because of shortage of direct links with BC Alytus, club started competing in the third tier of Lithuanian basketball, called RKL. Despite the declared aim of getting promotion to second tier, NKL, BC Savanoris lost to BC Olimpas in round of eight-final. The remnants of the team became the basis of future LKL team BC Dzūkija.

Achievements

Roster

References 

Basketball teams in Lithuania
Sport in Alytus
2011 establishments in Lithuania
Basketball teams established in 2011
2012 disestablishments in Lithuania
Basketball teams disestablished in 2012